Samsung Galaxy J4 Core is an Android smartphone manufactured by Samsung Electronics and was released in October 2018. It is the second Android Go-based smartphone manufactured by Samsung after the J2 Core.

Specifications

Hardware 
The Galaxy J4 Core is powered by an Snapdragon 425 SoC including a quad-core 1.4 GHz ARM Cortex-A53 CPU, an Adreno 308 GPU with 1 GB RAM and 16 GB of internal storage which can be upgraded up to 512 GB via microSD card.

It has a 6.0-inch IPS LCD display with HD ready resolution. The 8 MP rear camera has f/2.2 aperture and features autofocus, LED flash and Full HD video. The front camera has 5 MP with f/2.2 aperture and features LED flash.

Software 
The Galaxy J4 Core is shipped with Android 8.1 "Oreo" and Samsung's Experience user interface. The device uses a special version of Android which is named as Go edition and developed for low-end smartphones.

See also 

 Samsung Galaxy
 Samsung Galaxy J series
 Samsung Galaxy J2 Core
 Samsung Galaxy J3 (2018)
 Samsung Galaxy J6
 Samsung Galaxy J4+
 Samsung Galaxy J6+

References

External links 

Samsung Galaxy
Samsung smartphones
Android (operating system) devices
Mobile phones introduced in 2018